The women's heptathlon event at the 2010 Asian Games was held at the Aoti Main Stadium, Guangzhou, China on 22–23 November.

Schedule
All times are China Standard Time (UTC+08:00)

Records

Results 
Legend
DNF — Did not finish
DNS — Did not start

100 metres hurdles 
 Wind: +1.1 m/s

High jump

Shot put

200 metres
 Wind: +2.2 m/s

Long jump

Javelin throw

800 metres

Summary

References

Results

Athletics at the 2010 Asian Games
2010